976-EVIL II, also known as 976-EVIL 2: The Astral Factor, is a 1992 supernatural horror–slasher film directed by Jim Wynorski. The film is a sequel to the 1988 horror film 976-EVIL. It was referenced in Invasion of the Scream Queens (1992).

Premise
Leonard "Spike" Johnson (Patrick O'Bryan) returns to battle the supernatural in a small Californian college town. Someone is killing college co-eds at a rate that is causing alarm. A pretty student, Robin, learns that her dean, Professor Grubeck, is a ghost using astral projection and a satanic 976 "horrorscope" hotline to kill students.

Cast
 Debbie James as Robin
 Rene Assa as Mr. Grubeck
 Patrick O'Bryan as Leonard "Spike" Johnson
 Philip McKeon as Taylor
 Leslie Ryan as Paula
 Brigitte Nielsen as Agnes
 Rod McCary as Dr. Jamison
 Paul Coufos as Stone
 Karen Mayo-Chandler as Laurie
 George Buck Flower as Turrell
 Sigal Diamant as Barmaid
 Joy Ballard as Stripper
 Yavone Evans as Reporter
 Eric Anjou as Detective
 Angela Gordon as Cashier
 Christopher Garr as "Skeech"
 David Rogge as Keith
 Lou Bonacki as Neelan
 Chuck Montalbano as Gross
 Ace Mask as Lemisch
 Monique Gabrielle as Lawlor
 Deborah Dutch as Commercial Wife
 Ronald Green as Commercial Husband
 Mindy Seeger as Nurse

Production
The film was directed by Jim Wynorski who had gained a reputation for making a number of sequels, such as Deathstalker 2. "People would just come to me and ask," said Wynorski. "And I always said "yes". I wanted the money and the experience. There were only a couple of films that I turned down. I always wanted to make a sequel only if the previous film was bad. There wasn't much point to a sequel if the previous release was really great. I wanted to make a sequel that was better than the first one."

Wynorski later said "I hate that film... It was tough to make. I was handed a script and I didn't think it was very good." The only part of the film  he liked was a sequence where a girl was meant to be sucked into a Pac Man machine. This was too expensive to film so Wynorski came up with the idea, based on a dream, where he recreated a scene from It's a Wonderful Life (1946). He could do this because that film was in the public domain. "For me that's the one stand out aspect of that film, 'cause it's so weird," he said.

The film featured Brigitte Nielsen in a small role. Wynorski met her at a party and they played pool together. Wynorski challenged her to a wager - if he won she would do a day for him for scale on his next picture; if she won he would "put on a maid's outfit and clean your house. And she was up for that. We had a good game, it was close but I won." So Nielsen did a day on the film. Wynorski said she did "an ok job...  she wasn't difficult to work with. She was working for pretty big bucks at the time and she was working for scale and she didn't really come in super prepared and we had to go over her lines but in the end she did a great job."

Home media
The movie was released in April 1992 on videocassette by Vestron Video. A DVD was released in the UK. In the U.S., the film was released on DVD by Lionsgate as part of an 8 horror film DVD set.

References

External links

Smithee Awards entry

1992 direct-to-video films
1990s English-language films
Direct-to-video horror films
Telephone numbers in the United States
CineTel Films films
1992 horror films
1992 films
Films directed by Jim Wynorski
American direct-to-video films
American sequel films
Direct-to-video sequel films
Supernatural slasher films
American supernatural horror films
1990s American films